Riojan Style Potatoes or Patatas a la Riojana is a dish from Spanish cuisine, popular in the counties of Rioja and Álava in the Basque region of Spain. It's made with bell peppers, chorizo sausage and potatoes. The sauce is simple, and thickened by the potato starch. Other ingredients like bay leaves, pimenton and mushrooms may be added. Red wines complement this dish.

History 

It is not known when it was first made. However, potatoes were not used in soups in Spain until Napoleon's invasion, so it wasn't until at least the 19th century that this dish was eaten there. It is also said that Chef Paul Bocuse tasted this stew in a famous winery, and after three servings, told everybody that Riojan style potatoes were the best food he had ever eaten. The chef also recommended this dish to be the national dish of Spain. Riojan Style potatoes are usually served in the areas of Alava and Rioja.

References

External links 
 Patatas a la riojana Riojan Style Potatoes official page
 History

Potato dishes
Riojan culture
Spanish cuisine
Álava
Basque cuisine
Sausage dishes